The sixth series of Geordie Shore, a British television programme based in Newcastle upon Tyne, began airing on 9 July 2013, and concluded after 8 episodes concluding on 27 August 2013. Filming began for this series in April 2013 and concluded in May. This series was the first to be filmed in Australia. Former cast member Jay Gardner returned as a guest, who had originally appeared in the show from series one to three. This series focused heavily on Gaz and Scott being isolated from the group after putting getting with girls before the rest of the group, leading to a fight with James, Charlotte feeling homesick and considering leaving the series for her boyfriend Mitch, and a new blossoming romance between Vicky and Dan Conn.

Cast
 Charlotte-Letitia Crosby
 Gary Beadle
 Holly Hagan
 James Tindale
 Jay Gardner
 Scott Timlin
Sophie Kasaei
 Vicky Pattison

Duration of cast 
{| class="wikitable" style="text-align:center; width:40%;"
|-
! rowspan="2" style="width:15%;" | Cast members
|-
! style="text-align:center; width:10%;" | 1
! style="text-align:center; width:10%;" | 2
! style="text-align:center; width:10%;" | 3
! style="text-align:center; width:10%;" | 4
! style="text-align:center; width:10%;" | 5
! style="text-align:center; width:10%;" | 6
! style="text-align:center; width:10%;" | 7
! style="text-align:center; width:10%;" | 8
|-
! Charlotte
! style="background:#98FF98;" |
! style="background:#959FFD;" |
! style="background:#959FFD;" |
! style="background:#959FFD;" |
! style="background:#959FFD;" |
! style="background:#93f;" |
! style="background:#959FFD;" |
! style="background:#959FFD;" |
|-
! Gaz
! style="background:#959FFD;" |
! style="background:#959FFD;" |
! style="background:#93f;" |
! style="background:#959FFD;" |
! style="background:#959FFD;" |
! style="background:#959FFD;" |
! style="background:#959FFD;" |
! style="background:salmon;" |
|-
! Holly
! style="background:salmon;" |
! style="background:#98FF98;" |
! style="background:#959FFD;" |
! style="background:#959FFD;" |
! style="background:#959FFD;" |
! style="background:salmon;" |
! style="background:#98FF98;" |
! style="background:#959FFD;" |
|-
! James
! style="background:#959FFD;" |
! style="background:#959FFD;" |
! style="background:#93f;" |
! style="background:#f0f;" |
! style="background:#98FF98;" |
! style="background:#959FFD;" |
! style="background:salmon;" |
! style="background:#EBB761;" |
|-
! Jay
! style="background:#01DF3A;" |
! style="background:#00FFFF;" |
! colspan="6" style="background:gray;"|
|-
! Scott
! style="background:#959FFD;" |
! style="background:#959FFD;" |
! style="background:#93f;" |
! style="background:#959FFD;" |
! style="background:#959FFD;" |
! style="background:salmon;" |
! style="background:#98FF98;" |
! style="background:#959FFD;" |
|-
! Sophie
! style="background:#959FFD;" |
! style="background:#959FFD;" |
! style="background:#959FFD;" |
! style="background:#959FFD;" |
! style="background:#959FFD;" |
! style="background:#959FFD;" |
! style="background:#959FFD;" |
! style="background:#959FFD;" |
|-
! Vicky
! style="background:#959FFD;" |
! style="background:#959FFD;" |
! style="background:#959FFD;" |
! style="background:#959FFD;" |
! style="background:#959FFD;" |
! style="background:#959FFD;" |
! style="background:#959FFD;" |
! style="background:#959FFD;" |
|}

 = Cast member is featured in this episode.
 = Cast member voluntarily leaves the house.
 = Cast member is removed from the house.
 = Cast member leaves and returns to the house in the same episode.
 = Cast member returns to the house.
 = Cast member features in this episode, but is outside of the house.
 = Cast member returns to the series.
 = Cast member leaves the series.

Episodes

Ratings

References

2013 British television seasons
Series 06